Marie Batomene (born 10 March 1995) is a French badminton player. She started playing badminton at the age of eight, in her hometown Béthune. She was part of the national junior team that won the silver medal at the 2013 European Junior Championships. She clinched the women's singles national champion in 2019, where she before finished as the runners-up in 2013 and 2017. She competed at the 2018 Mediterranean Games and 2019 European Games.

Achievements

BWF International Challenge/Series (3 titles, 5 runners-up) 
Women's singles

Women's doubles

Mixed doubles

  BWF International Challenge tournament
  BWF International Series tournament
  BWF Future Series tournament

References

External links 
 

1995 births
Living people
People from Béthune
French female badminton players
Competitors at the 2018 Mediterranean Games
Badminton players at the 2019 European Games
European Games competitors for France
Mediterranean Games competitors for France
Sportspeople from Pas-de-Calais
20th-century French women
21st-century French women